Varca is a census town in South Goa district in the Indian state of Goa.

Geography
It has an average elevation of 0 metres (0 feet).

Beaches

Varca is renowned for its beaches, hence it has become a popular destination for tourists. The row of wooden fishing boats seen on the beach belongs to the Christian fishing community. Popular beach resorts and stays in Varca include the Caravela Beach Resort, Sterling Goa, Varca., ZURI White Sands Resort, the Club Mahindra Varca Beach Resort and Serenity By The Origami Collection, Goa, Monica Guest House, Varca Beach House.

Demographics
As of the 2001 India census, Varca had a population of 4859. Males constitute 47% of the population and females 53%. Varca has an average literacy rate of 77%, higher than the national average of 59.5%: male literacy is 80%, and female literacy is 75%. In Varca, 10% of the population is under 6 years of age. As of today, the population is about 25,000. Most of the males in Varca, take up jobs as Sea farers or as NRI(Non Resident Indians) in the middle east like Kuwait, UAE and Bahrain. The Town mostly comprises Catholics and Hindus.

Business
Businesses have boomed in Varca, since it is a tourist spot for major hotels. Many banks like HDFC Bank and Corporation Bank have opened their services in the town of Varca. Borkars Super Store, Magson's Supermarket, Home Centre etc provide a complete shopping experience for tourists and locals.

Monuments
The Our Lady of Gloria church is considered one of the oldest buildings in Varca. It is still operational with locals and many tourists attending its services. Beside the church, is St Mary's High School, which is managed and run by the church.

References

External links 

 Varca Photographs, 2012

Cities and towns in South Goa district
Beaches of Goa
Comunidades of Goa
Beaches of South Goa district